Paula Marques Alves (born 26 July 1967) is a Portuguese biochemical engineer who is a professor at the NOVA University Lisbon. She is the Chief Executive Officer of the Instituto de Biology Experimental e Tecnológica. She was elected a Fellow of the National Academy of Engineering in 2021.

Early life and education 
Alves was born in Lisbon. She was an undergraduate student at the University of Lisbon, where she specialized in biochemistry. She moved to the NOVA University Lisbon for graduate studies, where she developed three-dimensional in vitro models for brain cells. For part of her doctoral research she worked in nuclear magnetic resonance at the SINTEF Hospital in Trondheim and the University of Bremen in Germany. After earning her doctorate, she was appointed to the scientific team at the Instituto de Biology Experimental e Tecnológica (IBET).

Research and career 
At IBET, Alves held various scientific positions, including assistant and principal investigator. In 2007 she moved to the laboratory of Daniel Wang at Massachusetts Institute of Technology. The following year, she was made executive director of IBET, and in 2012, the chief executive officer.

Alves investigates the metabolism of the cell. Her interest in this area is two-fold; improving the efficiency of biochemical processes and developing sophisticated tools for biological research. She particularly focusses on how biopharmaceuticals are produced and the development of culture systems for cell therapy.

Alves is Chair of the European Society for Animal Cell Technology and has advised the Horizon 2020 board of the European Commission. She is the Editor of the Journal of Biotechnology.

Awards and honors 
 2009 NOVA University Lisbon Scientific Merit Award
 2017 Top 100 Portuguese Women Scientists
 2021 Oeiras City Council Gold Medal
 2021 Elected to the National Academy of Engineering

Selected publications

Personal life 
Alves is married with two children.

References 

1967 births
Living people